Fatehgarh Sahib Assembly constituency (Sl. No.: 55) is a Punjab Legislative Assembly constituency in Fatehgarh Sahib district, Punjab state, India.

Members of the Legislative Assembly

Election results

2022

2017

2012

See also 
Fatehgarh Sahib Lok Sabha constituency

References

External links
 
 Elections Results 2017

Assembly constituencies of Punjab, India
Fatehgarh Sahib district